Jan Hambourg ( – 29 September 1947) was a violinist, a member of a famous musical family, who made his career in Europe during the early 20th century.

Jan Hambourg was born in Voronezh, Russian Empire, the middle brother between the famous pianist Mark Hambourg (b. 1879) and the distinguished cellist Boris Hambourg (b. 1884), the sons of pianist Michael Hambourg (1855-1916). Jan studied first in London with August Wilhelmj and Émile Sauret, then in Frankfort-am-Main with Hikeerman, in Prague with Otakar Ševčík and in Brussels with Eugène Ysaÿe, who also gave instruction to his brother Boris. Jan made his debut in Berlin in 1905. In 1916 he married Isabelle McClung, the daughter of Judge Samuel McClung of Pittsburg. He died in Tours, France.

References

1882 births
1947 deaths
Violinists from the Russian Empire
20th-century Russian Jews
Jewish violinists
Male violinists
Soviet violinists
20th-century violinists
20th-century Russian male musicians